Drahelčice is a municipality and village in Prague-West District in the Central Bohemian Region of the Czech Republic. It has about 1,300 inhabitants.

History

The first written mention is from 1115.

References

Villages in Prague-West District